Homecoming: The Live Album (stylized in all caps, or as HΘMΣCΘMING: THE LIVE ALBUM) is the fifth live album by American singer-songwriter Beyoncé, released on April 17, 2019. Recorded in April 2018 at the Coachella Valley Music and Arts Festival in Indio, California, the album features the entirety of Beyoncé's performance at the festival, which has since been described as "historic" by a number of music critics and media outlets. Two bonus studio tracks – a cover of Maze's song "Before I Let Go" and "I Been On" – follow the live recording, bringing the album's length to just short of two hours.

The album accompanied a concert film about the performance, Homecoming, which premiered the same day on the streaming platform Netflix.

Background and recording 

On January 4, 2017, Beyoncé was announced as a headlining act for the April 2017 Coachella festival. However, on February 23, 2017, she postponed her performance until the following year, due to doctor's concerns regarding her pregnancy with twins (born in June 2017). Playing her rescheduled dates in 2018, Beyoncé became the first black woman ever to headline the festival. In its nearly twenty years of existence, the festival has only had two other women solo headliners, Lady Gaga (who replaced Beyoncé in 2017) and Björk (2002 and 2007). Even prior to Beyoncé's performance, the nickname "Beychella" emerged for the 2018 festival.

For her April 14 and 21, 2018, performances, some 100 dancers as well as her sister Solange, her husband Jay-Z, and her former girl group Destiny's Child joined Beyoncé on stage. She played a 26-song set to 125,000 concert-goers in attendance as well as millions watching via the live-stream on YouTube and subsequent playback. The set sampled Malcolm X and Nina Simone among others. The performance has been credited as paying a strong tribute to the HBCU experience.

A full marching band played during much of the set, accompanied by majorette dancers. Writing for Mic.com,  Natelegé Whaley stated that the band consisted of members from various HBCUs and played samples of songs that are often played at an HBCU such as "Swag Surf", "Broccoli", and "Back That Thang Up", along with samples of gospel and go-go music.
Journalists also noted that the set incorporated various aspects of black Greek life, such as a step show along with strolling by probates (pledges). Reviewers noted the influence of black feminism on Beyoncé's performance, including her sampling of Nigerian author Chimamanda Ngozi Adichie's TED Talk on feminism and the aforementioned appearances on stage of former collaborators Kelly Rowland and Michelle Williams of Destiny's Child as well as her sister Solange; writing in Cosmopolitan, Brittney Cooper read Beyoncé's decision to involve these black women in the landmark performance as a gesture of sisterhood.

Release 
The album was released on April 17, 2019, to coincide with the release of Homecoming, a documentary about the Coachella set that premiered on the streaming platform Netflix.

On October 16, 2020, the vinyl release of the album was announced for December 4 of the same year.

Critical reception 

Homecoming: The Live Album was met with widespread critical acclaim. At Metacritic, it received a weighted average score of 95, based on 6 reviews.

Writing for Los Angeles Times, Sonaiya Kelley named Homecoming: The Live Album as "one of the greatest live albums ever", with Makeda Easter adding that the "album is a piece of black history". Bernadette Giacomazzo of HipHopDX called the album an "artistically-sound triumph" as well as a "cultural touchstone and, quite possibly, the live album of a generation". Giacomazzo describes that what makes the album "so classic is that Beyoncé makes clear" that she is "Black Excellence, personified — and in her performance, she makes the audience believe that they, too, are Black Excellence personified".

Writing for Rolling Stone, Brittany Spanos described the album as "triumphant" and "awe-inspiring". She noticed that the live album successfully felt like a greatest hits collection (reimagined to fit the college homecoming theme and marching band) due to its lack of connection to any specific album. In a review for Pitchfork, Danielle Jackson praised the album as a "stunning" preservation of Beyoncé's Coachella performance, commending its focus on historical black artists. She wrote that the performance showcased Beyoncé at her vocal and physical peak, while celebrating "complex, diasporic blackness". She also applauded the album's mixing and engineering, and concluded that the "wondrous, rapturous collage" could serve as one of Beyoncé's most important albums. AllMusic's reviewer Neil Z. Yeung had similar sentiments, concluding that "Homecoming is a master class in technical prowess, crowd pleasing, and soulful substance. Channeling the spirit of African queen Nefertiti (whose image she adopted for this show), Beyoncé proved to be a ruler in her own right, lording over Coachella for two career-defining nights."

Accolades

Commercial performance 
Homecoming: The Live Album debuted at number seven on the US Billboard 200 with 38,000 album-equivalent units (including 14,000 in album sales) from only two days of tracking activity. It is Beyoncé's eighth solo US top 10 album. The following week, it rose to number four, earning 57,000 album-equivalent units (including 8,000 album sales). After the album's release, the studio version of "Before I Let Go" peaked at number 17 on the Billboard R&B/Hip-Hop Digital Song Sales Chart as well as number 3 on the Billboard R&B Digital Song Sales Chart. In the beginning of May, "Before I Let Go" debuted at number 75 in the US Billboard Hot 100 chart issue dated May 4, 2019. It peaked at number 65 in the US Billboard Hot 100 issue dated May 11, 2019.

Impact 
Homecoming: The Live Album has been said to have set a trend of musicians releasing albums with complementary film projects on Netflix. Lonely Island's The Unauthorized Bash Brothers Experience, Thom Yorke's Anima, Sturgill Simpson's Sound & Fury, and Kid Cudi's Entergalactic are all cited as examples of projects that have followed the precedent that Homecoming: The Live Album set. Sheldon Pearce for Pitchfork wrote that Homecoming kickstarted the "ongoing uprising" where "black women have been demanding ownership of their outsized impact on culture"; Jamila Woods' LEGACY! LEGACY! and Rapsody's Eve, as well as exhibitions such as "Black Women: Power and Grace" and "Posing Modernity", are mentioned as later works that constitute the "formative syllabus" that started with Homecoming.

Frankie Beverly, who originally sang "Before I Let Go", praised Beyoncé's cover of the song in Homecoming: The Live Album, saying "It's a blessing... She's done so much, this is one of the high points of my life." R&B legend Anita Baker also commented on Beyoncé's cover, describing Beyoncé as "Queen keeping R&B alive". Rolling Stone reported that the famed New Orleans band Rebirth Brass Band "gained new admirers" after Beyoncé sampled their song "Do Whatcha Wanna" on the track "Welcome".

Music director Derek Dixie called working on Homecoming: The Live Album a "blessing", adding that being nominated for an Emmy Award means that "I’ve kind of accomplished something for the home team and family." Dixie also said "It was just months and months of prep work, making it sound authentic. She has tons and tons of classic records that when putting the show together, you have to maintain the classic feel of the record but make it feel like you’re in a stadium at homecoming."

A 9-feet-tall statue of Beyoncé as seen on the Homecoming: The Live Album cover was unveiled at Mercedes-Benz Area in Berlin.

The "GO FIGURE" data visualization series explored the words and phrases that Beyoncé repeated throughout Homecoming and their impact on the viewer, with Semmi W. writing that Beyoncé "plants seeds of positive self-talk rather than doubt. Whether I was catching the subway or cleaning my apartment, her edict between my ears this weekend was cause for royal jubilee. In under two hours, Queen Bey kept declaring that we are all enough. In 162 sentences she told us to love, hustle, and claim what’s yours. She repeatedly affirmed my intrinsic worth as a black girl-turned-adult."

Through the tribute to HBCU culture in Homecoming: The Live Album (such as on the track "So Much Damn Swag"), Beyoncé increased people's interest in HBCUs. Students cited Homecoming as the reason that they were considering attending HBCUs, and Google searches for "HBCU" reached an all-time high after Homecoming: The Live Album was released.

Track listing 
Credits adapted from Beyoncé's official website.
All songs are produced by Beyoncé and Derek Dixie, except "Lift Ev'ry Voice and Sing", "So Much Damn Swag (Interlude)", "Bug a Boo Roll Call (Interlude)", "Lift Ev'ry Voice and Sing (Blue's Version)", which credit no producers, and the bonus tracks, "Before I Let Go" and "I Been On", that were produced by Tay Keith & Beyoncé and Timbaland & Beyoncé, respectively.

Personnel

Production 

 Beyoncé Knowles-Carter – live performance direction, executive production, music direction
 Derek Dixie – music direction, music mixing engineering, post audio engineering
 Teresa LaBarbera – audio production supervision
 Mariel Gomerez – music coordination
 Stuart White – music mixing engineering, post audio engineering
 Daniel Pampuri – recording engineering

 Lester Mendoza – music mixing engineering, recording engineering, post audio engineering
 Eric Hoffman – post audio engineering
 Daniel Pampun – assistant engineering
 Scott Kramer – assistant engineering
 Colin Leonard – mastering
 Kevin "Kwiz" Ryan – live performance audio engineering, recording engineering

Instrumentation 
Band

 Simone Bozyermini
 Janee Dixon
 Chris Gray
 Arnetta Johnson
 Chris Johnson
 Corbin Jones
 Marie Katre
 Ariel O'Neal

 Peter Ortega
 Lauren Robinson
 Crystal Torres
 Rie Tsuji
 Lessie Vonner
 Venzella Joy Williams
 Vidie Williams

The Bzzzz (drumline live)

 Rasaq Adeyemi
 Larry Allen
 Mathew Ashraf
 Jacques Bell
 Alex Blake
 Tallie Brinson
 Issac Carter
 Kadeem Chambers
 Brandon Cunningham
 Jalen Harvey
 Rashaad Horne
 Keir Garner
 Dasmyn Grigsby
 Michael Jones
 Giovanni Luevano

 Lomario Marchman
 Maurice Mosley
 Naderah Munajj
 Joey Oakly
 Sjoerd Onley
 Ralph Nadar
 Jason Price
 Loubins Richard
 Erin Robinson
 Travord Rolle
 Brian Snell
 Nathaniel Spencer
 Sean Torres
 Wayne Westley

Background Vocals

 Tiffanie Cross
 Jasmin Cruz
 Steve Epting
 Naarai Jacobs
 Jamal Moore
 Dwanna Orange

 Kiandra Richardson
 Tiffany Moníque Ryan (assistant vocal arranger, lead background vocalist/ choir director)
 Jerome Wayne
 Chimera Wilson
 Cameron Wright
 George Young

Strings

 Crystal Alforque
 Nathalie Barret-Mas
 Amber Camp
 Jasmin Charles
 Rhea Hosanny

 Jessica Mcjunkins
 Ezinma
 Chala Yancy
 Crystal Brooke

Charts

Weekly charts

Year-end charts

Certifications

References 

2019 live albums
Albums produced by Beyoncé
Beyoncé albums
Columbia Records live albums